The 1924 Brownlow Medal was the inaugural year the award was presented to the player adjudged the fairest and best player during the Victorian Football League (VFL) home and away season. Edward 'Carji' Greeves of the Geelong Football Club won the medal by polling seven votes during the 1924 VFL season.

Voting system 
The voting system used in the 1924 Brownlow Medal was as follows:
 The field umpire awarded one vote to whom he adjudged the best player on the field.
 The player who finished with the most votes would be awarded the 1924 Brownlow Medal.
 In the event of a tie, the umpiring panel would meet and agree upon a winner among the tied players.

Votes

Leading vote-getters 
The following list shows the leading vote-getters for the 1924 Brownlow Medal. Edward 'Carji' Greeves was the winner, with George Shorten and Bert Chadwick runners-up.

Greeves' outstanding season is further outlined by the fact that he is one of the youngest players to win the award, aged just 20 years 312 days at the time.

Greeves' seven best on grounds in just fourteen games played is another amazing statistic. With vote inflation included (where 1 vote in 1924 equals 3 votes), Greeves is one of the most consistent vote-getters of all time with an average of 0.81 votes per game throughout his 10-season career.

Team totals 
The following list shows the teams whose players polled the most votes. Geelong topped the list with 11 votes, 7 of them made up by 'Carji' Greeves.

The team that polled the most votes, missed the 1924 VFL finals by two games, finishing 5th.

Leading vote-getters by team 
The following list shows the players who topped their team for the most votes polled.

Presentation 
The Brownlow Medal was presented to the player at League Headquarters, without the fanfare, glitz and glamour of the award today.

References

External links 
 1924 Brownlow Medal at AFL Tables

Brownlow Medal, 1924
Brownlow Medal